The Woman in His House is a 1920 American silent drama film produced by Louis B. Mayer, directed by John M. Stahl, and starring Mildred Harris.

It is a lost film with no archive holdings.

Plot
As described in a film magazine, with the coming of their little son, Dr. Philip Emerson (Wallace) and his wife Hilda (Harris) drift slowly apart. The doctor spends most of his time at his work and permits his friend Peter Marvin (Holding) and Robert Livingston (Fisher), a lounge lizard, to occupy his wife's time. When Peter sees the trend of feeling between Hilda and Robert, he seeks to bring about a better understanding between the husband and wife. However, an epidemic of infantile paralysis absorbs the physician's time and he neglects his wife. When their own son is stricken, Hilda. believing her son has died, leaves his bedside. He is revived, and the father devotes every minute of his time for several weeks attempting to find a cure, but the child is hopelessly crippled. Peter finally brings about a meeting between Hilda and the child, and what science could not accomplish is done by love.

Cast
Mildred Harris as Hilda (credited as Mildred Harris Chaplin)
Ramsey Wallace as Dr. Philip Emerson
Thomas Holding as Peter Marvin
George Fisher as Robert Livingston
Gareth Hughes as Sigurd
Richard Headrick as Philip Emerson Jr.
Winter Hall as Hilda's Father, Andrew Martin
Katherine Van Buren as Emerson's Assistant (credited as Catherine Van Buren)
Robert Walker as Associate Doctor (credited as Bob Walker)

References

External links

Portrait of Mildred Harris (University of Washington, Sayre collection)

1920 films
American silent feature films
Films directed by John M. Stahl
1920 drama films
Silent American drama films
Lost American films
Films produced by Louis B. Mayer
American black-and-white films
1920 lost films
Lost drama films
1920s American films
1920s English-language films